Adventure Time is the second album by the rock/pop trio The Elvis Brothers. The album was released in 1985 on Portrait Records. The basic tracks and first mixes were recorded at Fifth Floor Recorders in Cincinnati, OH, with producer Adrian Belew. The redubbing and remixing were done by George Tutko and John Boylan at Cherokee Studios in Los Angeles.

The album was reissued in 1995 by Sony/Recession Records with their debut album Movin' Up, with both albums on a single CD.

Reception
Writing for AllMusic, Stewart Mason said "There's perhaps a little too much of the standard mid-'80s production gloss, but not so much that the largely impressive batch of rootsy pop songs is overwhelmed."
Ira Robbins wrote: "Adrian Belew's more complex production of Adventure Time doesn't dampen the E-Bros.' lighthearted spirit."

Tracks
Burnin' Desire
Somebody Call The Police
Don't Take My Guns Away
Holy Moly
Crosswinds
Count To Three
I Wonder Why
Akiko Shinoda
Chin Up
Big Ideas

Personnel
Rob Elvis (Rob Newhouse) - guitar, vocals
Graham Elvis (Graham Walker) - bass, vocals
Brad Elvis (Brad Steakley) - drums

References

External links

1985 albums
Albums produced by Adrian Belew
The Elvis Brothers albums
Portrait Records albums